is a large Cryptomeria tree (yakusugi) located on Yakushima, a UNESCO World Heritage Site, in Japan.  It is the oldest and largest among the old-growth cryptomeria trees on the island, and is estimated to be between 2,170 and 7,200 years old. Other estimates of the tree's age include "at least 5,000 years", "more than 6,000 years", and "up to 7,000 years old".  The tree's name is a reference to the Jōmon period of Japanese prehistory.

Discovery of the tree in 1968 "sparked moves to protect the forests" of Yakushima and gave rise to the island's tourist industry, which today comprises more than half of its economy.

Jōmon Sugi is accessible via the Kusugawa Hiking Path (east of Miyanoura) and the Arakawa Trail (starting at the Arakawa Dam), but requires a "four-to-five hour mountain hike" from the nearest road to reach.

Tree-ring dating conducted by Japanese scientists on the tree's branches indicated that Jōmon Sugi is at least 2,000 years old. In Remarkable Trees of the World (2002), arborist Thomas Pakenham describes Jōmon Sugi as "a grim titan of a tree, rising from the spongy ground more like rock than timber, his vast muscular arms extended above the tangle of young cedars and camphor trees".

In April 2009, Jōmon Sugi was partnered with Tāne Mahuta in New Zealand's Waipoua Forest.

See also
 List of oldest trees
 List of records of Japan
 Great sugi of Kayano
 List of individual trees

References

External links

 Trail to Jomon cedar, Yakushima, Kagoshima-ken, image gallery

Individual conifers
Tourist attractions in Kagoshima Prefecture
Jōmon period
Geography of Kagoshima Prefecture
Individual trees in Japan
Oldest trees